Fight of the Year is an award given to the boxing match considered to be the best fight that year. It is awarded by a variety of different institutions. It may refer to:

 The Ring magazine Fight of the Year – awarded by The Ring magazine
 Ali–Frazier Award – the Boxing Writers Association of America's fight of the year

See also
 Sugar Ray Robinson Award (formerly known as the Edward J. Neil Trophy) – the Boxing Writers Association of America's Fighter of the Year
 The Ring magazine Fighter of the Year
 The Ring magazine Knockout of the Year
 Best Boxer ESPY Award
 Best Fighter ESPY Award

Boxing awards